KOWS-LP (92.5 FM) is a radio station licensed to serve the community of Occidental, California. The station is owned by KOWS Community Radio. It airs a variety format.  The current program director is Don Campau, who hosts his own program No Pigeonholes EXP.

The station was assigned the KOWS-LP call letters by the Federal Communications Commission on September 22, 2005.

References

External links
 Official Website
 

OWS-LP
OWS-LP
Radio stations established in 2005
2005 establishments in California
Variety radio stations in the United States
Sonoma County, California